The Ryggedal Tunnel (also known as the Bø Tunnel) is a road tunnel that is part of Norwegian County Road 820 in the municipalities of Bø and Øksnes in Nordland county, Norway.

Work on the tunnel was begun in 1977 under the leadership of the engineer Edward Pegg, and the tunnel was opened on October 17, 1980. One-sixth of the tunnel has molded concrete vaulting.

The tunnel and its road gave the municipality of Bø a ferry-free road connection with the outside world, and it replaced the ferry crossings between Kråkberget in the municipality of Bø and Sandset in the municipality of Øksnes.

Like many other tunnels in Norway, the Ryggedal Tunnel has condensation problems. Condensation can lead to dangerous situations because the pavement suddenly becomes damp when entering the tunnel. The tunnel's infrastructure was upgraded in 2015.

References

Bø, Nordland
Øksnes
Road tunnels in Nordland
1980 establishments in Norway
Roads in Nordland
Roads within the Arctic Circle
Tunnels completed in 1980